In enzymology, a 12-hydroxydihydrochelirubine 12-O-methyltransferase is an enzyme that catalyzes the chemical reaction

S-adenosyl-L-methionine + 12-hydroxydihydrochelirubine  S-adenosyl-L-homocysteine + dihydromacarpine

Thus, the two substrates of this enzyme are S-adenosyl methionine and 12-hydroxydihydrochelirubine, whereas its two products are S-adenosylhomocysteine and dihydromacarpine.

This enzyme belongs to the family of transferases, specifically those transferring one-carbon group methyltransferases.  The systematic name of this enzyme class is S-adenosyl-L-methionine:12-hydroxydihydrochelirubine 12-O-methyltransferase. This enzyme participates in alkaloid biosynthesis i.

References

 

EC 2.1.1
Enzymes of unknown structure